John Henry Prowse (16 June 1871 – 20 May 1944) was an Australian politician. Born in Adelong, New South Wales, he was educated at public schools and then at Kings College, Melbourne. He became an insurance agent and then a station owner in Western Australia, where he eventually became a Perth City Councillor, serving as Mayor 1913–1914. In 1919, Prowse was elected to the Australian House of Representatives as the member for Swan, representing the Farmers' and Settlers' Association, which in 1920 solidified to become the Australian Country Party. Prowse transferred to the new seat of Forrest in 1922, allowing party colleague Henry Gregory (member for the abolished Dampier) to contest Swan.  He served as chairman of committees from 1934 to 1943, the first member of his party to hold the position.

Prowse held Forrest until his defeat in 1943 by future Labor minister Nelson Lemmon. He died at his home in Donnybrook, Western Australia the following year.

References

1871 births
1944 deaths
National Party of Australia members of the Parliament of Australia
Members of the Australian House of Representatives for Swan
Members of the Australian House of Representatives for Forrest
Members of the Australian House of Representatives
Mayors and Lord Mayors of Perth, Western Australia
20th-century Australian politicians
People from Adelong, New South Wales